The Way of Courage is a populist political party in Lithuania. It was founded in 2012 and has an anti-corruption platform.

History 

The party was established by supporters of Drąsius Kedys, who claimed that justice officials had whitewashed a ring of pedophiles after his daughter had been sexually molested. Kedys died under unclear circumstances in 2010. Among the party's founders is Neringa Venckienė, sister of Drąsius Kedys and former judge.

The party's name alludes to Kedys' first name Drąsius which means "the brave". The goals include changes in the justice system, e.g. the establishment of trial by jury. In 2012 parliamentary election the party gained approximately 8% of the popular vote. The party had its best performance in Kaunas and Kaunas District Municipality.

After the party's leader Neringa Venckiene applied for asylum in the United States, many party members decided not to participate in the future elections because of the "exile" of their leader.

The party's chairman is Jonas Varkala, a former Catholic priest, who officially left the church in February 2012. He was a constant critic of the ethics of the leaders of the church, particularly in regards to sexual abuse of children.

In 2014 with impeachment of Neringa Venckienė and Valdas Vasiliauskas moving to the Order and Justice parliamentary group, the party's parliamentary group was dissolved as it had less than 7 members.

In 2016 the party won just over 1 per cent of the votes and lost all representatives in parliament.

Member of Seimas (2012–2016) 
 Neringa Venckiene (born 1971), (MP until 2014, Impeached), Judge
 Jonas Varkala (born 1951), Priest
 Aurelija Stancikienė (born 1966), Architect
 Algirdas Vaclovas Patackas (born 1943), (MP until 2015, Died), Signer of the Lithuanian Declaration of Independence
 Dr. Vytautas Antanas Matulevičius (born 1952), Journalist
 Prof. Povilas Gylys (born 1948), Economist
 Valdas Vasiliauskas (born 1951), Journalist
 Prof. dr. Gintaras Aleknonis (born 1961), (refused to be sworn in), Journalist. 
 Prof. Stasys Brundza (born 1947), (MP from 2014), Economist
 Audrius Nakas (born 1967), (MP from 2015), Actor

Political ideology 
The party is considered populist. It contained a mix of political beliefs. Jonas Varkala and Algirdas Patackas were the conservative members of the party. While Vytautas Matulevičius was a liberal and one of the first Lithuanian politicians to support LGBT rights. Povilas Gylys was a former member of the Lithuanian Social Democratic Party and a former communist of USSR.

Election results

Seimas

References

External links
Official website

2012 establishments in Lithuania
Political parties established in 2012
Political parties in Lithuania
Organizations based in Kaunas
Garliava